The 2019 PFF National Challenge Cup final was a football match between Pakistan Army and Sui Southern Gas played on 4 August 2019 at Tehmas Khan Football Stadium in Peshawar. Pakistan Army won their National Challenge Cup title after having won the last time in 2001.

Road to final

Match

Details

Match rules
90 minutes.
30 minutes of extra time if necessary.
Penalty shoot-out if scores still level.
Seven named substitutes.
Maximum of three substitutions.

References

Pakistan, final
2019 in Khyber Pakhtunkhwa
National Challenge Cup final
2010s in Peshawar
August 2019 sports events in Pakistan
Sport in Peshawar